Karenga is a town in the Northeast of the Karamoja region of Uganda. It is located in the new Karenga District, which became effective in 2019.

It is known as one of the primary gateways into Kidepo Valley National Park. Karenga town is composed of various tribes both from Acholi and karamoja with vast languages and even the south Sudanese 'Mening quarters' Karenga are one of the most proud lucky farmers in nomadic karamoja and the soil supports growth of various food crops for subsistence home stead use.

See also
 List of cities and towns in Uganda

References

Populated places in Uganda
Cities in the Great Rift Valley